Pinewood School is a private, non-sectarian college preparatory school in the affluent Silicon Valley communities of Los Altos and Los Altos Hills, in Santa Clara County, California.

History
Founded in 1959, by Gwen Riches, the school began as an afternoon creative arts program. By 1964 enrollment had increased to 350 students, and the newly named Creative Workshop became established as a full-time private school.

Pinewood is the sister school of Oakwood School, Morgan Hill, which was founded by Gwen Riches' eldest daughter and her husband.

Academics
Pinewood School is accredited by the Western Association of Schools and Colleges and is a member of the National Association of Independent Schools.

Notable alumni
 John M. Chu, film director
 Larisa Oleynik, actress

References

External links
Pinewood School official website

Preparatory schools in California
Schools in Santa Clara County, California
Los Altos, California
Private elementary schools in California
Private middle schools in California
Private high schools in California
Educational institutions established in 1959
1959 establishments in California